Owls to Athens is a historical novel written by H.N. Turteltaub (a pseudonym of Harry Turtledove). It was first published in hardcover by Forge Books in December 2004. The book was reissued under the author's real name as a trade paperback and ebook by Phoenix Pick in March 2015. It is the fourth book of the so-called "Hellenic Traders" series of historical novels.

Plot
The book features the continuaing adventures of a pair of Greek traders from Rhodes. Sostratos and Menedemos arrive in Athens in time for the Dionysia. Sostratos spends much of his time visiting with his old teachers. His cousin, Menedemos finds himself having a sexual encounter with an important Athenian woman.

Title
"Taking owls to Athens" was a contemporary Greek saying, roughly the equivalent of the modern "selling snow to eskimos" or "carrying coals to Newcastle". The saying referred to the owl depicted on Athenian silver drachmas, Attica being home to large silver mines.

Setting
The setting is Athens in 307 BC, sixteen years after the death of Alexander the Great. As in the other books in the series, persons and places are frequently given their original Greek names (Sokrates, Platon, etc.) rather than the Latin-derived ones common in English.

References

2004 American novels
Hellenic Traders novels
Novels set in ancient Greece
Forge Books books